Liberal Reformers (RL) was a minor liberal, libertarian and liberist political party in Italy led by Benedetto Della Vedova, a former President of the Italian Radicals.

History
RL was founded in 2005 by a split from the Italian Radicals of those radicals that were opposed to the formation of the Rose in the Fist alliance together with the Italian Democratic Socialists, as a component of the wider centre-left The Union, and instead supported an alliance with the centre-right House of Freedoms. The party united former Radicals, as many former members of the Italian Liberal Party and of Forza Italia.

After 2006 general election (in which Della Vedova was elected MP on Forza Italia's list), the explicit aim of the grouping is to unite the Italian centre-right into a single party and to strengthen liberal and secular positions in it. Liberal Reformers acted both as a faction of Forza Italia both as a unifying agent of centre-right liberals.

In October 2006, Liberal Reformers launched a manifesto called "Give a libertarian soul to the centre-right" together with famous journalists (Vittorio Feltri, Arturo Diaconale, Filippo Facci and Giordano Bruno Guerri), academics and politicians from both Forza Italia and National Alliance.

On 1 November Della Vedova called on the Italian Radicals to join the centre-right in the next general election. Some days earlier, Della Vedova had wished that he, Marco Pannella, Emma Bonino and Daniele Capezzone will found themselves together again in the centre-right. On 7 November, when Capezzone finally left the Radicals and the centre-left, Della Vedova opened the doors of Forza Italia and the centre-right for him.

In the 2008 general election RL were part of the list of The People of Freedom (PdL) and had two deputies elected: Benedetto Della Vedova and Giuseppe Calderisi. Soon after the election, Daniele Capezzone, who had previously joined the centre-right, was appointed by Berlusconi as spokesman of Forza Italia. In 2009 the party was merged into the PdL and its members, led by Della Vedova, formed a new association named Libertiamo. The party was merged in 2009 into The People of Freedom. Within the new party Della Vedova distanced from his mentor Silvio Berlusconi and got very close to Gianfranco Fini and Generation Italy instead. In July 2010, Della Vedova left the PdL to become a member of Fini's new party Future and Freedom.

Ideology
Liberal Reformers had a libertarian platform, including a strong support for free market, privatization, deregulation, lower taxes, and competition in the health care and education systems. They also proposed an American-styled reform of Italian political system (their slogan was "America, Market, Individual"), including presidentialism, competitive federalism, and a first-past-the-post plurality voting system. Despite being a small party, the RI were also keen supporters of a two-party system.

In foreign policy they were staunchly pro-American and very supportive of human rights all over the world. Internationally Liberal Reformers, along with the Italian Radicals, were members of the Transnational Radical Party, a NGO working at the United Nations level.

The party had a socially progressive stance on abortion and stem cell research, despite not stressing too much the point. The party supported also civil unions for homosexual couples, but, differently from other liberal parties, opposed civil unions for opposite-sex couples and same-sex marriage. Della Vedova explained this position by arguing that there is no need of regulation for free cohabitation of opposite-sex couples and, instead, he proposed swift procedures for divorce, which are very lengthy in Italy.

Liberal Reformers were very keen on the return of Italy to the use of nuclear energy (which was prohibited by a referendum proposed by the Radical Party in 1987) and were also the party of the centre-right to be more involved in green politics, by contesting the hegemony of left-wing politics on these issues, and proposed a new liberal-green parth for the centre-right. Explicitly inspired by the "Vote blue, go green" campaign of the British Conservative Party led by David Cameron, they launched their own campaign on the subject, named "+ Blue, + Green. A competition of ideas. A liberal policy on the environment for the program of the centre-right".

Leadership
 President: Benedetto Della Vedova (2005–2009)
 Spokesman: Marco Taradash (2005–2009)
 Coordinator: Giuseppe Calderisi (2005–2009)
 Secretary: Carmelo Palma (2005–2009)

See also
 Libertiamo

References

External links
 Official website
 Official website of Benedetto Della Vedova
 Manifesto "Give a libertarian soul to the centre-right"

2005 establishments in Italy
2009 disestablishments in Italy
Liberal parties in Italy
Radical parties in Italy
Political parties established in 2005
Political parties disestablished in 2009
Libertarianism in Italy
Classical liberal parties
Libertarian parties
Defunct liberal political parties
Defunct political parties in Italy